Mueang Lampang is the capital district (amphoe mueang) of Lampang province, northern Thailand.

Geography
Neighboring districts are (from the north clockwise): Mueang Pan, Chae Hom, Mae Mo, Mae Tha, Ko Kha and Hang Chat of Lampang Province, Mae Tha of Lamphun province, and Mae On of Chiang Mai province.

The Khun Tan Range rises in the west and the Phi Pan Nam Range in the east of the district.

History
In 1917 the district was renamed from Mueang to Mueang Lampang.

Administration
The district is divided into 19 sub-districts (tambons), which are further subdivided into 180 villages (mubans). Lampang is a city (thesaban nakhon) covering tambons Wiang Nuea, Suan Dok, Sop Tui and parts of tambons Hua Wiang, Phichai, Chomphu, Phrabat, and Bo Haeo. The town (thesaban mueang) Khelang Nakhon covers tambons Kluai Phae and Pong Saen Thong, and parts of tambons Phrabat and Chomphu. There are two sub-district municipalities (thesaban tambon): Bo Haeo and Phichai. Each cover parts of the same-named tambons. There are a further 11 tambon administrative organizations (TAO).

References

Mueang Lampang